St John the Evangelist's Church is in Sandbach Heath, about  northeast of Sandbach, Cheshire, England.  It is an active Anglican parish church in the deanery of Congleton, the archdeaconry of Macclesfield, and the diocese of Chester.  Its benefice is united with those of Christ Church, Wheelock, and St Philip, Hassall Green.  The church is recorded in the National Heritage List for England as a designated Grade II listed building.

History

St John's was built in 1861 and designed by George Gilbert Scott following a bequest of £5,000 (equivalent to £ in ).

Architecture

The church is constructed in yellow stone from Mow Cop with red sandstone dressings, and has Westmorland slate roofs.  Its plan is cruciform, consisting of a nave, north and south transepts, a chancel, and a central tower with a spire.  The windows contain plate tracery.  The interior walls are faced with ashlar, and the capitals are richly carved with foliage.  The woodwork in the chancel, including the reredos, was carved by Jessie H. Kennerley.  The windows at the east and west ends contain stained glass by Clayton and Bell dating from about 1863.  The two-manual pipe organ was built in 1864 by W. Sweetland of Bath.

External features

The churchyard contains the war grave of a Cheshire Regiment soldier of World War I.

See also

List of new churches by George Gilbert Scott in Northern England
Listed buildings in Sandbach

References

Church of England church buildings in Cheshire
Grade II listed churches in Cheshire
Churches completed in 1861
19th-century Church of England church buildings
Gothic Revival church buildings in England
Gothic Revival architecture in Cheshire
Diocese of Chester
George Gilbert Scott buildings
1861 establishments in England